Wando may refer to:

Animals
Wando (horse), a thoroughbred racehorse that won the Canadian Triple Crown

People
Wando people, a Native American tribe
Wando (singer) (1945–2012), Brazilian singer
Wando (footballer, born 1963), full name Geovânio Bonfim Sobrinho, Brazilian football winger
Wando (footballer, born 1980), full name Wando da Costa Silva, Brazilian football winger

Places
Wando County, a county in South Korea
Wando (island), an island in South Jeolla
Wando, an unincorporated community in Berkeley County, South Carolina
Wando River, a river in United States
Wando Chiefdom, a chiefdom in Sierra Leone

Schools
Wando High School, a high school in United States

Ships
USS Wando, the name of more than one United States Navy ship